{|
{{Infobox ship image
|Ship image=
|Ship caption= UC-57s memorial; Major Nordström lay the Jäger association's wreath in 1934
}}

|}SM UC-57''' was a German Type UC II minelaying submarine or U-boat in the German Imperial Navy during World War I. The U-boat was ordered on 12 January 1916, laid down on 14 March 1916, and was launched on 7 September 1916. She was commissioned into the German Imperial Navy on 22 January 1917 as SM UC-57. In seven patrols UC-57 was credited with sinking 5 ships, either by torpedo or by mines laid.UC-57 disappeared in 1917 after landing a party of Finnish Jägers and 4 tons of munitions on the island of Hamnskär, circa  from Loviisa, on 18 November. UC-57 was going to remain on the seabed overnight and then return to Germany but never arrived. She was probably sunk by a Russian mine.

Design
A German Type UC II submarine, UC-57 had a displacement of  when at the surface and  while submerged. The submarine was powered by two six-cylinder four-stroke diesel engines each producing  (a total of ), two electric motors producing , and two propeller shafts.

UC-57'' was fitted with six  mine tubes, eighteen UC 200 mines, three  torpedo tubes (one on the stern and two on the bow), seven torpedoes, and one  Uk L/30 deck gun. Her complement was twenty-six crew members.

Summary of raiding history

References

Notes

Citations

Bibliography

 
 

Ships built in Danzig
German Type UC II submarines
U-boats commissioned in 1917
Maritime incidents in 1917
U-boats sunk in 1917
U-boats sunk by mines
World War I minelayers of Germany
World War I shipwrecks in the Baltic Sea
World War I submarines of Germany
1916 ships
Ships lost with all hands